Tickell's brown hornbill (Anorrhinus tickelli), also known as the rusty-cheeked hornbill, is a species of hornbill found in forests in Burma and adjacent western Thailand. Austen's brown hornbill is sometimes considered as a subspecies of Tickell's brown hornbill.

Description 
The male has brighter rufous cheeks and throat. Juveniles of both sexes resemble adult males.

Habitat 
It inhabits evergreen and deciduous hill forest from foothills to 1500 m.

It breeds co-cooperatively, in groups.

Habitat loss to logging and agriculture is known to be prevalent within its range.

The binomial commemorates the ornithologist Samuel Tickell.

References

Tickell's brown hornbill
Birds of Myanmar
Birds of Thailand
Tickell's brown hornbill
Tickell's brown hornbill